Ludhianvi is a Muslim surname, meaning someone from Ludhiana in India. The surname may refer to the following notable people:
Abdul Majeed Ludhianvi (1934–2015), Pakistani Islamic scholar
Barkat Ali Ludhianwi (1911–1997), Pakistani Muslim Sufi of the Qadri tariqa
Habib-ur-Rehman Ludhianvi (1892–1956), Indian Islamic religious leader
Muhammad Ahmed Ludhianvi (born 1950), Pakistani Muslim leader
Muhammad Yusuf Ludhianvi (1932–2000), Pakistani Sunni Muslim scholar
Rashid Ahmed Ludhianvi (1922–2002), Pakistani Islamic scholar 
Sahir Ludhianvi (1921–1980), Indian poet and film song lyricist

Urdu-language surnames
Indian surnames
Toponymic surnames
People from Ludhiana
Nisbas